Joe O'Dwyer is an Irish sportsperson.  He plays hurling with his local club Killenaule and with the Tipperary senior inter-county team since 2015. He is a cousin of fellow Tipperary hurler John O'Dwyer.

Career
O'Dwyer was named in the Tipperary squad for the 2015 National Hurling League and made his league debut on 15 February against Dublin starting at right corner back in a 2-20 to 0-14 defeat in Parnell Park.	

On 21 May 2017, O'Dwyer made his championship debut when he came on as a second half substitute in the 1-26 to 2-27 defeat to Cork in the 2017 Munster Senior Hurling Championship.

O'Dwyer made his first championship start for Tipperary on 1 July 2017 in the 2-18 to 0-15 win against Westmeath in round 1 of the All Ireland Qualifiers in Semple Stadium.

References

External links
Tipperary GAA Player Profile

Tipperary inter-county hurlers
Killenaule hurlers
Living people
Year of birth missing (living people)